Procol's Ninth is the eighth studio album (ninth including Live) by Procol Harum, and was released in August 1975. Produced by songwriters Jerry Leiber and Mike Stoller, Procol's Ninth featured a slightly different direction from the previous album, with a much starker sound than Chris Thomas's more elaborate productions. According to an interview with guitarist Mick Grabham, conducted by Roland Clare for the 2009 reissue, Leiber and Stoller focused less on the production sound and more on "the structure of the songs". The band appeared on the cover of the album in a straightforward unassuming photograph, mirroring the sound of the album itself. The cover featured simulations of each band member's signature.

Procol's Ninth was the first release from the band to feature non-original songs: a remake of The Beatles' "Eight Days a Week" and Leiber & Stoller's own "I Keep Forgetting". "Eight Days a Week" was put on the album by the producers, initially against the band's wishes. The album also featured "Pandora's Box", a track that had been composed by Gary Brooker and Keith Reid early in the band's career.  Cash Box said of "Pandora's Box" that "we guarantee you’ll be humming this Procol heavy night and day by the time Halloween rears its head a few weeks from now." As included on Ninth, it differed substantially from the more psychedelic unfinished version of the song that was ultimately released as a bonus track on the 2009 reissue of the band's first album.

Track listing
All tracks written by Gary Brooker and Keith Reid, except as noted.

Side one 
 "Pandora's Box" – 3:36
 "Fool's Gold" – 3:58
 "Taking the Time" – 3:35
 "The Unquiet Zone" – 3:34
 "The Final Thrust" – 4:32

Side two 
"I Keep Forgetting" (Jerry Leiber, Mike Stoller) – 3:25
 "Without a Doubt" – 4:30
 "The Piper's Tune" – 4:23
 "Typewriter Torment" – 4:25
 "Eight Days a Week" (John Lennon, Paul McCartney) – 2:54

2009 reissue bonus tracks
Salvo reissued the Procol Harum discography in 2009; the albums were remastered by Nick Robbins, with bonus tracks selected by Gary Brooker and Keith Reid. Procol's Ninth included three bonus tracks that featured little to no overdubs for each track:

 "The Unquiet Zone" (raw track) – 4:23
 "Taking The Time" (raw track) – 4:34
 "Fool's Gold" (raw track with Brooker's guide vocal) – 3:53

Personnel
Procol Harum
 Gary Brooker – vocals, piano
 Mick Grabham – guitar
 Chris Copping – organ
 Alan Cartwright – bass guitar
 B. J. Wilson – drums
 Keith Reid – lyrics

References

External links
 ProcolHarum.com – ProcolHarum.com's page on this album

Procol Harum albums
1975 albums
Albums produced by Jerry Leiber
Albums produced by Mike Stoller
Chrysalis Records albums
Repertoire Records albums